Myosin-2 (myosin heavy chain 2) is a protein that in humans is encoded by the MYH2 gene.

References

Further reading